Delavirdine (DLV) (brand name Rescriptor) is a non-nucleoside reverse transcriptase inhibitor (NNRTI) marketed by ViiV Healthcare. It is used as part of highly active antiretroviral therapy (HAART) for the treatment of human immunodeficiency virus (HIV) type 1. It is presented as the mesylate. The recommended dosage is 400 mg, three times a day.

Although delavirdine was approved by the U.S. Food and Drug Administration in 1997, its efficacy is lower than other NNRTIs, especially efavirenz, and it also has an inconvenient schedule. These factors have led the U.S. DHHS not to recommend its use as part of initial therapy.
The risk of cross-resistance across the NNRTI class, as well as its complex set of drug interactions, make the place of delavirdine in second-line and salvage therapy unclear, and it is currently rarely used.

Its manufacturing and distribution was discontinued in the United States and Canada.

Interactions 

Like ritonavir, delavirdine is an inhibitor of cytochrome P450 isozyme CYP3A4, and interacts with many medications. It should not be administered with a wide range of drugs, including amprenavir, fosamprenavir, simvastatin, lovastatin, rifampin, rifabutin, rifapentine, St John's wort, midazolam, triazolam, ergot medications, and several medications for acid reflux.

Adverse effects
The most common adverse event is moderate to severe rash, which occurs in up to 20% of patients. Other common adverse events include fatigue, headache and nausea. Liver toxicity has also been reported.

Synthesis

Modification of the scheme that was done for ateviridine q.v. by performing the reductive alkylation with acetone gives 2 after removal of the protecting group. Acylation of this amine with the imidazolide from 5-Methylsulfonaminoindole-2-carboxylic acid (1) affords the amide, reverse transcriptase inhibitor, atevirdine.

References

External links 
 

CYP2D6 inhibitors
CYP3A4 inhibitors
Hepatotoxins
Non-nucleoside reverse transcriptase inhibitors
Pfizer brands
Aminopyridines
Piperazines
Carboxamides
Indoles
Sulfonamides